Karibu Airways was an airline in the Democratic Republic of the Congo.

It stood on the List of air carriers banned in the EU. Due to two plane crashes in 2007 (see below) the confidence in the airline was lost. subsequently, all operations came to a halt. The airline was never officially disestablished, but as of March 2009 no staff is employed anymore.

Accidents and Incidents
21 June 2007: One passenger was killed and thirteen injured, when a Let L-410UVP turboprop-powered aircraft (reg 9Q-CEU) crashed into a swamp on takeoff from Kamina Airport. The aircraft  came to rest lying on its roof. Investigations revealed that the aircraft was overloaded, carrying 22 passengers and 3 crew. A Let-410 aircraft is laid out for 19 passengers and 2 crew.  The only casualty of the crash was a member of the National Assembly of the Democratic Republic of the Congo.
24 September 2007: The pilot was killed and five passengers were injured, when a Let-410UVP turboprop-powered aircraft in Karibu livery being operated by Free Airlines crash-landed.

Further reading
Malemba Nkulu : réactions après le crash de l’avion de Karibu Airways (English: Reactions after the crash of a Kariub Airways Airplane) Radio Okapi, Katanga 26 September 2007 (in French)
LET 410 down in Kamina Town, DRC PPRuNe 21 June 2007
Kamina Airport profile at Aviation Safety Net
Karibu Airways profile at Aviation Safety Net

See also		
 Transport in the Democratic Republic of the Congo

References

Defunct airlines of the Democratic Republic of the Congo
Companies based in Kinshasa